Eunice Mafalda Michiles (born June 10, 1929) is a Brazilian writer, teacher and politician. In 1979, she took office as Senator for Amazonas, being the first woman to take office in the Federal Senate after Princess Isabel of Brazil.

She was Federal Deputy for Amazonas between 1987 and 1991 by Liberal Front Party (PFL), participating of the 1988 Constituent Assembly.

Personal life
Michiles is a member of the Seventh-day Adventist Church.
Darcy Humberto Michiles (PL) is her son.

References 

1929 births
People from São Paulo
Brazilian women in politics
Brazilian women writers
Brazilian people of German descent
Liberal Party (Brazil, 1985) politicians
Democrats (Brazil) politicians
National Renewal Alliance politicians
Democratic Social Party politicians
Members of the Legislative Assembly of Amazonas
Members of the Chamber of Deputies (Brazil) from Amazonas
Members of the Federal Senate (Brazil)
Brazilian feminists
Brazilian Seventh-day Adventists
Living people